Virescence is the abnormal development of green pigmentation in plant parts that are not normally green, like shoots or flowers (in which case it is known as floral virescence). Virescence is closely associated with phyllody (the abnormal development of flower parts into leaves) and witch's broom (the abnormal growth of a dense mass of shoots from a single point). They are often symptoms of the same disease affecting the plants, typically those caused by phytoplasmas. The term chloranthy is also sometimes used for floral virescence, though it is more commonly used for phyllody.

The term was coined around 1825, from Latin virescere, "to become green". In the English language the term virescent may also refer to greenness (cf. verdant).

See also
 Chlorosis
 Forest pathology
 Phytopathology

References

Plant pathogens and diseases